Braj, also known as Vraj, Vraja, Brij or Brijbhumi, is a region in India on both sides of the Yamuna river with its centre at Mathura-Vrindavan in Uttar Pradesh state encompassing the area which also includes Palwal and Ballabhgarh in Haryana state, Bharatpur, Karauli and Dholpur in Rajasthan state and Morena District in Madhya Pradesh. Within Uttar Pradesh it is very well demarcated culturally, the area stretches from the Mathura, Aligarh, Agra, Hathras and districts up to the Farrukhabad, Mainpuri and Etah districts. Braj region is associated with Radha and Krishna who according to scriptures were born in Barsana and Mathura respectively. It is the main centre of Krishna circuit of Hindu pilgrimage.

It is located 150 km south of Delhi and 50 km northwest of Agra.

Etymology
The term Braj is derived from the Sanskrit word vraja (व्रज). Vraja was first mentioned in Rigveda, and in Sanskrit it means a pasture, shelter or resort for cattle from Sanskrit term "" which means "go" in English.

Braj pilgrimage circuits

Since this is a site associated with the Vedic era Lord Krishna and Mahabharata, it is an important place of pilgrimage for Hindus. It is one of 3 main pilgrimage sites related to Krishna circuit, namely 48 kos parikrama of Kurukshetra in Haryana state, Vraja Parikrama in Mathura in Uttar Pradesh state and Dwarka Parikrama (Dwarkadish yatra) at Dwarkadhish Temple in Gujarat state.

Braj Yatra circuit of pilgrimage was formally established by the 16th-century sadhus of vaishnava sampradaya with fixed routes, itinerary and rituals. The circuit covers is spread across 2500 km2 area with 84 kos or 300 km long periphery extending 10 km to east and 50 km to north and west. Braj has two main types of pilgrimage circuits, the traditional longer Braj Yatra encompassing the whole circuit, and the other shorter significantly modified contemporary point-to-point pilgrimage to visit the main sites at Mathura, Vrindavan, Gokul, Govardhan. The former, longer traditional pilgrimage route, also includes additional sacred sites Nandgaon and Barsana with travel on foot.

See also
 Regional
 Braj language
 Vajji, the ancient region of the Vṛji janapada that Bajjika evolved from

 Religious
 48 kos parikrama of Kurukshetra
 Dwarka
 Hindu pilgrimage sites in India

 Vedic era
 King Kuru
 Cemetery H culture
 Painted Grey Ware culture

 General
 Kingdoms of Ancient India
 Regions of Haryana
 Regions of Rajasthan
 Regions of Uttar Pradesh

References

Further reading
Rupert Snell, The Hindi Classical Tradition: A Braj Bhasa Reader.  Includes grammar, readings and translations, and a good glossary.

Krishna
Mahabharata
Yadava kingdoms
Rigvedic tribes
Indo-Aryan peoples
Iron Age countries in Asia
Iron Age cultures of South Asia
Ancient peoples
Locations in Hindu mythology
Regions of Haryana
Regions of Rajasthan
Regions of Uttar Pradesh
Tourism in Uttar Pradesh
Brij